Natalya Maksimovna Tenyakova (born July 3, 1944, Leningrad) is a Soviet and Russian actress of theater and cinema. People's Artist of the Russian Federation (1994), Laureate of the Golden Mask Award (1995) and the Stanislavsky Prize (2005).

Biography
Natalya Tenyakova was born in Leningrad in 1944, graduated from the Leningrad State Institute of Theater, Music and Cinematography (LGITMiK) (Boris Sohn's course). Her fellow students were Olga Antonova, Lev Dodin, Victor Kostetskiy, Sergei Nadporozhsky,  Leonid Mozgovoy, Vladimir Tykke, other masters of theater and cinema.

After graduation she was accepted into the troupe of the Baltic House Festival Theatre, where she made her debut as Polly Peachum in  The Threepenny Opera (1966).

In the movie debuted in 1966, one of the main roles in the Georgy Natanson's film Older Sister.

In 1967, Natalya Tenyakova became an actress of the Leningrad Bolshoi Drama Theater.

Since 1979, Natalia Tenyakova worked at the Mossovet Theater, where she also became one of the leading actresses. In 1988, at the invitation of Oleg Yefremov moved to the Chekhov Moscow Art Theater.

Personal life
Was married to  director Lev Dodin. Wife of actor Sergei Yursky. Daughter   Daria Yurskaya (1973), actress.

Filmography
 Older Sister (1966) as  Lydia
 The Green Carriage (1967) as  Varvara Asenkova
 Our Friends (1968) as Antonina Staroselskaya
 Thunderstorm over Belaya (1968) as Sasha Vikhrova
 Death of Wazir Mukhtar (TV, 1969)  as  Thaddeus Bulgarin's wife
 Love and Pigeons (1984) as old woman Shura
 Investigation Held by ZnaToKi  (1985) as Yevdokia Matveyevna Stolnikova
 Love and Pigeons (1985) as old woman Shura
 Chernov / Chernov (1990) as Chernov's wife
 Chekhov and Co. (1998) as Dasha
 Fathers and Sons (TV, 2008) as  Bazarov's mother
 A Frenchman (2019) as Maria Obrezkova

References

External links
 

1944 births
Living people
Actresses from Saint Petersburg
Recipients of the Order of Honour (Russia)
People's Artists of Russia
Honored Artists of the RSFSR
Russian State Institute of Performing Arts alumni
Soviet film actresses
Soviet stage actresses
Soviet television actresses
Soviet voice actresses
Russian film actresses
Russian stage actresses
Russian television actresses
Russian voice actresses
20th-century Russian women